is Pink Lady's seventh single release, released on March 25, 1978. This became their sixth number-one hit on the Oricon Chart in Japan. The single sold  1,800,000 copies, and spent nine weeks at number one on the chart.

Background 
According to songwriter Yū Aku, the song was inspired by Crown Lighter Lions pitcher Tamotsu Nagai, who used an underthrow to strike out Sadaharu Oh at the 1977 All-Star Game.

The dance choreography uses a baseball motif. Traditionally, Mie and Kei wear tank tops and shorts patterned after baseball uniforms.

Reception 
The duo won the 1978 Japan Music Awards with this song.

According to Oricon, this was the second best selling single from 1978, after "UFO".

Other uses 

A re-recorded version of the song was included on the 2-disc greatest hits release, INNOVATION, released in December 2010.

Controversy 
In July 2019, the cheering squad for the Chunichi Dragons stopped playing the song when it was decided that one line of the lyrics was offensive.

Track listing (7" vinyl) 
All lyrics are written by Yū Aku; all music is composed and arranged by Shunichi Tokura.

Chart positions

Cover versions 
 The song was performed live by Chisato Moritaka as part of her Pink Lady Medley in the concert video Moritaka Land Tour 1990.3.3 at NHK Hall, released on Blu-ray in 2013.
 Girl group Speed recorded a cover of this song in 1997.
 Trasparenza covered the song in their 2002 album Pink Lady Euro Tracks.
 Idol duo W covered the song in their 2004 debut album Duo U&U. 
 Checkicco recorded a cover version for the 2009 Pink Lady/Yū Aku tribute album Bad Friends.
 Ryoko Shiraishi and Yūko Sanpei covered the song in the 2009 anime Natsu no Arashi!.
 The tribute group Pink Babies covered the song in their "Nagisa no Sindbad" Type-A single in 2016.
 Yōko Aramaki covered the song in her 2019 album Respect! ~Watashi ga Shōwa wo Utattara Kon'na Kanji!~.

References

External links
 
 

1978 singles
1978 songs
Pink Lady (band) songs
Japanese-language songs
Baseball songs and chants
Disco songs
Oricon Weekly number-one singles
Songs with lyrics by Yū Aku
Songs with music by Shunichi Tokura
Victor Entertainment singles